Diggers in Blighty is a 1933 Australian film starring and directed by Pat Hanna. Hanna decided to direct this film himself after being unhappy with how F. W. Thring had handled Diggers (1931).

Plot
While serving in the Australian Army in France in 1918, soldiers Chic and Joe steal some rum from the quartermaster's store. They later help British intelligence pass on some false battle plans to a German spy and are rewarded with ten days' leave in England. They go to a country house in Essex and have trouble with their uncouth manners but help some upper class friends have a romance.

Cast
Pat Hanna as Chic Williams 
Joe Valli as Joe McTavish
George Moon as Joe Mulga
Norman French as Sir Guy Gough
John D'Arcy as Captain Jack Fisher
Prudence Irving as Alison Dennett
Thelma Scott as Judy Fisher
Edwin Brett as the Colonel
Nellie Mortyne as Aunt Martha
Isa Crossley as the sister
Raymond Longford as Von Schieling
Guy Hastings as quartermaster sergeant
Field Fisher as Muddles
George Randall as Colonel Mason
Alfred Frith as a Tommie
Reg Wykeham as WO Pay Corps
Sylvia Sterling as French adventuress

Production
The script was based on material Hanna had performed on stage for years. Although Hanna did not make the film under the Efftee umbrella, he hired Efftee Studios facilities and technical staff.

The film was shot over six weeks commencing in October 1932. Many of the cast had appeared on stage, including Hanna, Valli and Moon. They were joined by comedian Alfred Firth in his film debut.

Old Melbourne Gaol stood in for a medieval castle.

Reception
The movie was released on a double bill with an Effee film, Harmony Row (1932). Hanna later claimed that the film was a big success at the box office but due to the amounts taken by cinema owners and distributors it took him over a year for his production costs to be recovered.

Contemporary reviews were poor, the critic from the Sydney Morning Herald claiming that:
Everyone in the play seems to be talking at the top of his or her voice; and talking so fast that the listener often grows quite desperate trying to keep up with them. Any microscopic respites from speech are zealously filled up with bursts of lively music... The directors must realise that actors need directing when they are before the camera. Merely to turn the players (however clever) loose in a drove across the studio floor is fatal.... The acting... is often much too violent for the screen; and, in the case of the women, the energetic "registering" of emotion recalls the early days of the silent screen... Mr. Hanna would be wise to consult well-informed opinion concerning his story and his continuity. Both are exceedingly weak.

The film was released in England.

Diggers in Blighty proved to have a long life and Hanna re-released it regularly over the next 20 years. It was appearing in cinemas as late as 1952.

References

External links 

Diggers in Blighty at Oz Movies
Diggers in Blighty at Australian Variety Theatre Archive
1933 Variety review

1933 films
Australian black-and-white films
Australian comedy films
1933 comedy films
1930s English-language films